Abdelmalek Amara (born 10 March 2000) is an professional footballer who plays for FC Rouen. Born in France, he represents Algeria internationally.

Club career 
Having been part of Le Havre and Bastia youth setup, a documentary was shot by Fabrice Macaux on his career and his hopes of becoming a professional footballer.

International career
Born in France, Amara is of Algerian descent. He represented the Algeria U20s in May 2018.

References

External links
 

2000 births
Living people
Footballers from Rouen
Algerian footballers
Algeria youth international footballers
French footballers
French sportspeople of Algerian descent
Association football forwards
MC Oran players
Championnat National 2 players
Algerian Ligue Professionnelle 1 players